Voodoo Doughnut is an American doughnut company based in Portland, Oregon with a current total of 16 locations in California, Colorado, Florida, Oregon, Washington, and Texas. Its shops are known for their unusual doughnuts, decor that has been compared to "Goth Barbie’s living room," and pink boxes featuring the company logo and an illustration of a voodoo priest.

History 

Voodoo Doughnut was founded in May 2003 by Kenneth “Cat Daddy” Pogson and Richard "Tres" Shannon III. The company's logo features a version of Baron Samedi, Voodoo Loa of the dead. During the business's first few years, it was only open at night.

The original location closed between April to June 2011 for remodeling after the company acquired space next door that was formerly occupied by a nightclub called Berbati's Pan. Much of the expansion involved creating additional room for the kitchen.

In August 2011, Voodoo Doughnut's staff constructed an enlarged version of its box for the Portland Bridge Festival that contained 3,880 doughnuts. The box was filled with smaller boxes and topped off with individual doughnuts until it reached 666 lbs, a number which, as Shannon explained, was chosen to go along with the company's voodoo theme. According to NBC News, it was the biggest box of doughnuts in the world.

Also in 2011, Voodoo Doughnut began partnering with Rogue Ales to convert several of its doughnut flavors into bottled beer. These have included: Bacon Maple Ale and Chocolate, Peanut Butter, and Banana Ale. The latter was taken from its Memphis Mafia doughnut, which serves a tribute to Elvis Presley. That same year, the Los Angeles Times declared Voodoo Doughnut an international tourist attraction.

In April 2017, a man choked to death while attempting to consume a half-pound doughnut within 80 seconds at the Colfax Avenue location in Denver. The eating contest was a long-running tradition at other locations as well. According to the contest's rules, anyone capable of eating the entire cake-sized treat would receive a commemorative pin and not have to pay for the doughnut. The tradition has been suspended since this incident.

During a historic heatwave in June 2021, several workers at the same location staged a walkout after arguing that working conditions were unsafe. Employees reported temperatures as high as 96 degrees Fahrenheit within the shop and one claimed that he felt close to passing out from the heat. A total of three employees were later fired for the incident.

Unionization 

In 2020, workers at the downtown Portland location began an effort to unionize and formed an organization called the Doughnut Workers United. Requests for increased security was one of the things sought by the union following an incident involving a man armed with a hatchet in March 2020. Their efforts to officially unionize and have the organization recognized by the company's management failed after a tie vote in June 2021, but organizers vowed to try again. Employees at the store filed for a new election with the National Labor Relations Board in August 2022. At the time, they were seeking improved wages, better and more consistent scheduling, and increased safety standards in the wake of robberies and attacks on employees at the location. In October 2022, a second vote passed 16-6. The workers are now affiliated with Doughnut Workers United, part of the IWW

Doughnuts

Voodoo Doughnut offers over 100 varieties. Two of their doughnuts, the NyQuil Glazed doughnut and the Vanilla Pepto Crushed Tums doughnut, are no longer available due to an order from local health officials. According to one of the company's co-owners, "The NyQuil one was kind of a lark, but that's the one that got the most famous. With the Pepto doughnut, I honestly thought if you had that shot of tequila you shouldn't have at 2:00 a.m., and then you got sugar, bread, Pepto, and Tums, you'd either feel better or puke your ass off and then feel better because you got it out of your system. So it was a win-win either way."

On December 24, 2008, Voodoo Doughnut's Portland Creme doughnut was designated Portland's "Official City Doughnut" by a resolution introduced by Portland Mayor Tom Potter and passed by city commissioners the same night. The resolution also expressed Portlanders' "deepest gratitude to Voodoo Doughnut management for its dedication in the face of these stringent economic times in providing employment opportunities... and above all, creating and naming a doughnut after our beloved city that leaves a lasting taste and fond memories on its customers near and far away." Later, Mayor Potter and mayoral candidate Sam Adams attended a midnight doughnut-eating contest.

Operations
As of January 2023, the company has sixteen locations with an additional two in development. The first opened in 2003 at 22 Southwest 3rd Avenue in the Old Town Chinatown neighborhood of Portland. To celebrate their fifth anniversary, Voodoo Doughnut opened a second branch at 1501 Northeast Davis Street named Voodoo Doughnut Too in the Kerns neighborhood. The operation began with a "soft opening" on May 30, 2008, with limited hours. The official opening was in June 2008 and featured a parade that traveled from the original location to the new one. A location in Taipei also launched in 2015 but is no longer in business. In January 2022, a location in Vancouver, Washington was opened.

Wedding services
Voodoo Doughnut offers legal wedding services followed by doughnuts and coffee. In an effort to "ritualize" the name “Voodoo,” both Pogson and Shannon became ordained ministers of the Universal Life Church, and subsequently performed both real and fake wedding ceremonies in their shops.

Television

Voodoo Doughnut has been featured on television series including: No Reservations, Man v. Food, and Doughnut Paradise.

Jay Leno included a joke about Voodoo Doughnut during a 2004 Tonight Show opening monologue and said: "Did you hear about the doughnut shop in Portland, Oregon, that has caffeinated doughnuts? Yeah, I guess you can stay awake during your bypass surgery."

Voodoo Doughnut Recordings
In 2013, Voodoo Doughnut founders, Cat Daddy and Tres, started a record label named Voodoo Doughnut Recordings with the intent of establishing a catalog of doughnut-related music to help promote the company's brand. Early novelty acts included The Deep Fried Boogie Band and The Doughnut Boys.
The label expanded to other artists such as Poison Idea, The Dandy Warhols, Dead Moon, Smegma, Jerry Joseph, Devin Millar, Big Duck, and Hazel. The label also releases recordings of comedians such as Ian Karmel.

See also
 Michael King (graphic designer), Voodoo Doughnut logo
 List of doughnut shops

References

External links

 Voodoo Doughnut website
 Voodoo Doughnut Official Facebook
 In Pursuit of a Trans-Fat-Free Doughnut (Day to Day, March 19, 2007) from the National Public Radio website

2003 establishments in Oregon
Bakeries of the United States
Companies based in Portland, Oregon
Culture of Portland, Oregon
Doughnut shops in the United States
Kerns, Portland, Oregon
Old Town Chinatown
Privately held companies based in Oregon
Restaurants in Oregon
Restaurants established in 2003
Southwest Portland, Oregon
Theme restaurants